Mahnike is a sub-clan of the Sial clan of Rajputs and Jats. They mostly inhabit the village of Mahnika Thatta near Wijhalke on the right bank of the Chenab river near the Jhang-Lalitan road in the province of Punjab in Pakistan.

See also
Sial
Sheikhan
Talhi Mangini
Teja Berwala
Mirza Sahiba

Social groups of Pakistan
Punjabi tribes